Hirundapus is a genus of swifts in the family Apodidae. The name Hirundapus is constructed from the names of the  swallow genus Hirundo and the swift genus Apus.
 
It contains the following species:
 White-throated needletail (Hirundapus caudacutus)
 Purple needletail (Hirundapus celebensis)
 Silver-backed needletail (Hirundapus cochinchinensis)
 Brown-backed needletail (Hirundapus giganteus)

References

 
Bird genera
Taxonomy articles created by Polbot